Guangdong-Hong Kong Cup 1993–94 is the 16th staging of this two-leg competition between Hong Kong and Guangdong.

The first leg was played in Mong Kok Stadium on 9 January 1994 while the second leg was played in Guangzhou on 16 January 1994.

Guangdong regained the champion by winning an aggregate 8–7 after penalty shootout against Hong Kong.

Squads

Hong Kong
Some of the players in the squad include:
  Chan Sau Yin 陳秀賢
  Chiu Chun Ming 趙俊明
  Chan Chi Keung 陳志強
  Yan Lik Kin 甄力健
  Chan Wai Chiu 陳偉超
  Lee Kin Wo 李健和
  Chiu Chung Man 招重文
  Sham Kwok Pui 岑國培
  Tim O'Shea 奧沙
  Ross Greer 基亞
  Dale Tempest 譚拔士
  Lee Wai Man 李偉文
  Ng Chun Chong 吳圳聰

Guangdong
Some of the players in the squad includes:
  Xie Yuxin 谢育新
  Kong Guoxian 孔国贤
  Mai Chao 麦超
  Li Yong 李勇
  Lü Jianjun 吕建军
  Ling Xiaojun 凌小君
  Yao Debiao 姚德彪 
  Zhang Bing 张兵
  Yu Weiteng 余伟腾
  Ou Chuliang 区楚良
  Peng Weiguo 彭伟国
  Chi Minghua 池明华 
  Fan Zhiyi 范志毅 (guest player)
  Xu Hong 徐弘 (guest player)
  Su Maozhen 宿茂臻 (guest player)

Trivia
 Fan Zhiyi's sent off in extra time made him the first player to be sent off in this competition.
 Yan Lik Kin is the only player who missed in the penalty shootout.

Results
First Leg

Second Leg

References
 HKFA website 省港盃回憶錄(八) (in Chinese)

1993-94
1993–94 in Hong Kong football
1994 in Chinese football